Teisnach  is a river of Bavaria, Germany. It flows into the Schwarzer Regen, the upper course of the Regen, in the town Teisnach.

See also
 List of rivers of Bavaria

References

Rivers of Bavaria
Rivers of Germany